Sphenorhynchia plicatella is an extinct species of brachiopods belonging to the family Prionorhynchiidae.

These brachiopods are stationary epifaunal suspension feeders. They lived in the Jurassic period, from 167.7 to 161.2 Ma.

References

External links
 Europeana

Jurassic brachiopods
Rhynchonellida